Bill Maskill Jr. is an American football coach and former player. He is the head football coach at Midwestern State University in Wichita Falls, Texas, a position he had held since the 2002 season. Maskill served as the head football coach at Southeast Missouri State University from 1988 to 1989.

Head coaching record

References

External link
 Midwestern State profile

Year of birth missing (living people)
Living people
American football quarterbacks
Arizona State Sun Devils football coaches
Bowling Green Falcons football coaches
Iowa Hawkeyes football coaches
Louisville Cardinals football coaches
Midwestern State Mustangs football coaches
Northern Michigan Wildcats football coaches
Oregon Ducks football coaches
SMU Mustangs football coaches
Southeast Missouri State Redhawks football coaches
Tulane Green Wave football coaches
Vanderbilt Commodores football coaches
Wake Forest Demon Deacons football coaches
Western Kentucky Hilltoppers football players